Secret World – Live in Paris is a live album by the British pop rock band Tears for Fears, released on 27 February 2006 by the French record label XIII Bis.

The band's first official live album, it was recorded at the Parc des Princes stadium in Paris, France, during their 2005 world tour.  The two-disc release contains a CD album along with a DVD video of the performance.

The CD also contains three additional studio tracks; the previously unreleased "Floating Down The River", a radio edit of "Secret World" (released as a promo single in France, taken from the band's sixth album Everybody Loves a Happy Ending) and "What Are We Fighting For?", a song written and originally included on Curt Smith's 1998 album Mayfield.

Track listing 

Tracks 1–9 recorded in Paris, 18 June 2005. Tracks 10–12 are studio recordings.

DVD listing 
"Secret World" (Orzabal)
"Call Me Mellow" (Orzabal, Pettus, Smith)
"Sowing the Seeds of Love" (Orzabal, Smith)
"Pale Shelter" (Orzabal, Smith)
"Closest Thing to Heaven" (Orzabal, Pettus, Smith)
"Mad World" (Orzabal)
"Everybody Wants to Rule the World" (Hughes, Orzabal, Stanley)
"Head Over Heels" (Orzabal, Smith)
"Shout" (Orzabal, Stanley)

Personnel 
Tears for Fears
 Roland Orzabal – lead vocals (1, 2, 3, 5, 8, 9), rhythm guitar, additional lead guitar, backing vocals
 Curt Smith – lead vocals (4, 6, 7), bass guitar, backing vocals
 Doug Petty – keyboards
 Charlton Pettus – lead guitar
 Nick D'Virgilio – drums

 Studio track credits 
 Roland Orzabal – vocals, instruments, guitars (11)
 Curt Smith – vocals, instruments
 Charlton Pettus – instruments, guitars, backing vocals 
 Fred Ettringham – drums (10)
 Nick D'Virgilio – drums (11)
 Shawn Pelton – drums (12)
 Joel Peskin – baritone saxophone (10), tenor saxophone (10)
 Steve Kujaja – flute (10)
 Gary Grant – trumpet (10), flugelhorn (10)
 David Washburn – trumpet (10), flugelhorn (10)

Orchestra on "Secret World (Radio Edit)"
 Paul Buckmaster – arrangements and conductor
 Suzie Katayama – contractor 
 Stefanie Fife, Barry Gold, Maurice Grants, Vahe Hayrikyan, Suzie Katayama, Miguel Martinez, Dan Smith and Rudy Stein – cello 
 Gayle Levant – harp
 Bob Becker, Denyse Buffman, Roland Kato, Carole Mukogawa, Karie Prescott and Evan Wilson – viola
 Charlie Bisharat, Eve Butler, Mario DeLeon, Joel Derouin, Julian Hallmark, Armen Garabedian, Berj Garabedian, Norm Hughes, Peter Kent, Michael Markman, Robert Matsuda, Sid Page, Sandra Park, Sara Parkins, Bob Peterson, Lesa Terry, Josefina Veraga and John Wittenberg – violin

References 

[ Secret World Live in Paris] at Allmusic

Tears for Fears albums
Live video albums
2006 live albums
2006 video albums